The Sopwith 1913 Circuit of Britain Biplane was a British floatplane built by Sopwith to take part in the 1913 Daily Mail Circuit of Britain Air race.  The only entrant to start, it had to be withdrawn after a landing accident two-thirds of the way through the race.

Design and development
The Circuit of Britain biplane was a four-bay tractor biplane with a  square-section fuselage with the forward part covered with aluminium back to the aft cockpit and the remainder covered with fabric. The forward sections of the longerons were made of ash and the rear sections of spruce.  Lateral control was effected by ailerons on both the upper and lower wings, which were staggered and had  spruce spars spindled to an I section and hollow interplane struts.  The tail surfaces consisted of unbalanced elevators mounted on the large semi-circular tailplane and an aerodynamically balanced rudder, with no fixed vertical surface. The single step main floats had a framework of ash and spruce covered with two layers of cedar and were divided into three watertight compartments.  It was powered by a 100 hp (75 kW) Green E.6, the radiators of which were placed either side of the fuselage.

Operational history
The competition was to start at Southampton on Saturday 16 August, the rules permitting the attempt to take place during any 72-hour period before the end of the month.  Of the four entrants to the race, the Sopwith, piloted by Harry Hawker with Harry Kauper as passenger, was the only aircraft to start.  Samuel Cody had been killed while testing the aircraft he had built for the competition, the aircraft entered by James Radley and Gordon England had been damaged during trials and Francis McClean's Short biplane was delayed by engine problems which kept it from competing.
  
Hawker and Kauper started shortly before noon and reached Great Yarmouth on the East Anglian coast at 4.38. where Hawker collapsed shortly after landing.  This was ascribed to sunstroke but may have been due to Carbon monoxide poisoning.  (The exhaust pipe of the aircraft was subsequently lengthened, but this may have been to reduce noise).  Under the competition rules there was no flying on the Sunday,  so an attempt was made to resume the flight on the Monday, with Sydney Pickles taking over as pilot, but this was impossible due to deteriorating weather conditions.

A second start was allowed by the race authorities, and the aircraft was returned to Southampton by rail.  The second attempt started on Monday 25 August when Hawker and Kauper took off at 5.30 am. Flying via Ramsgate, Yarmouth and Scarborough, Seaham - where an unscheduled hour stop was made to effect repairs and replace lost radiator water - and ending the day at Beadnell, about  short of the control point at Berwick-on-Tweed, due to one of the radiator hoses having been burnt through.  The next day they left Beadnell at 8.05, stopping at Montrose, Aberdeen and Cromarty  and reaching Oban on the west coast of Scotland at six in the evening,  and took off on the third day at 5.42 am; after a stop at Kiells due to engine problems Larne was reached at 9.30.  At 11 they took off for Dublin, but a few miles short of their destination Hawker decided to land in order to make adjustments to the  engine valves.  Unfortunately his foot slipped from the rudder bar and the aircraft sideslipped into the water, breaking Kauper's arm and damaging the aircraft too seriously for the flight to be continued.

Although they had only covered two-thirds of the  course, Hawker was awarded a prize of £1,000 and was also awarded the Royal Aeronautical Society's silver medal; Kauper was awarded a bronze medal.

Specifications

Other 1913 Circuit of Britain aircraft
Cody floatplane
Radley-England waterplanes

References

Notes

Bibliography
Blackmore, L.K. Hawker: A Biography. Shrewsbury: Airlife, 1993 
Lewis, Peter, British Aircraft 1809-1914. London: Putnam, 1962.

1910s British aircraft
Racing aircraft
Floatplanes
1913 Circuit of Britain floatplane
Biplanes
Single-engined tractor aircraft
Aircraft first flown in 1913